Frank Smathers House, also known as The Evergreens, is a historic home located at Waynesville, Haywood County, North Carolina. It was built in 1926, and is a -story, "H"-shaped, eclectic frame dwelling with Gothic Revival and Colonial Revival style design elements. It features a steeply pitched, cross gable roof with imbricated fish-scale asphalt shingles, brick interior slope chimneys, projecting eaves, and exposed rafters. Also on the property are a contributing barn (c. 1900) and stone retaining wall (1926). It was built as a summer home and family cottage for the Frank Smathers family, who owned the home from 1926 until 1988.  U.S. Senator George Smathers (1913-2007) was a son of Frank Smathers.

It was listed on the National Register of Historic Places in 1998.

References

External links

Houses on the National Register of Historic Places in North Carolina
Gothic Revival architecture in North Carolina
Colonial Revival architecture in North Carolina
Houses completed in 1926
Houses in Haywood County, North Carolina
National Register of Historic Places in Haywood County, North Carolina
Waynesville, North Carolina